R2Bees is a Ghanaian hip hop and hiplife duo from Tema made up of two cousins, Faisal Hakeem and Rashid Mugeez. They were nominated at the 2013 BET Awards. In March 2019, the duo released their third studio album Site 15.

Career

2007–2012: Da Revolution I
R2BEES's first single, "Yawa Gal", was released in August 2008. They then went on to release "I Dey Mad", which featured Unda melodies. The song topped most Ghanaian Radio Music Charts for weeks. In 2010, R2Bees released "Kiss Your Hand" as their third single.

In 2009, R2Bees released a 17-track album Da Revolution which has already released songs; ‘Yawa Girl’, I dey Mad’, ‘T.E.M.A’, ‘Kiss Your Hand’ with new songs; ‘Radio’, ‘One more Chance’ and ‘Africa’ with production from KillBeatz (Joseph Addison) as well as guest appearances from Wande Coal, Sarkodie, Samini, Kwaw Kese and a host of others.

2013–present: Da Revolution II: Refuse to be Broke
Their second studio album, Refuse To Be Broke – Da Revolution II, was released on 29 March 2013. The album had guest appearances from Wizkid, Sherifa Gunu, Davido, Tinchy Stryder and Voicemail. The album's production was handled by KillBeatz. R2Bees released their first official single for 2014, "Lobi". The highlife influenced songs video was released on 25 September 2014.

Recognition and music style
R2Bees often sing and rap in native language Twi and Pidgin. R2bees is one of the top purveyors of Ghanaian hip pop subgenre hiplife, which mixes rap with sounds of hilife (African pop music) and reggae. In 2012, R2Bees was featured in Forbes' list of "African celebrities to watch in 2013". R2Bees have performed on the same stage with international musicians such as American R&B singers Mario and J Holiday.

Discography

Studio albums
Da Revolution I (2009)
Da Revolution II: Refuse to be Broke (2012)
Omar Sterling – Victory Through Harmony (2017)Site 15 (2019)Back 2 Basics (2021)

Awards and nominations

BET Awards

|-
|BET Awards 2013
|rowspan="1"|R2Bees
|rowspan="1"|Best International Act: Africa
|
| 

Ghana Music Awards

|-
|rowspan="3"|2015
|rowspan="1"|R2Bees
|Group of the year
|
|- 
|rowspan="1"|Lobi
|Highlife song of the year
|
|-
|rowspan="1"|Killing me softly 
|Afro pop song of the year
|
|-
|rowspan="5"|2014
|rowspan="3"|R2Bees
|Group of the year 
|
|-
|Hiplife/ Hip Hop Artiste of the Year
|
|-
|Artist of the year
|
|-
|rowspan="2"|"Slow down"
|Best Collaboration of the Year
|
|-
|Vodafone Song of the Year
| 
|-
|rowspan="9"|2013
|rowspan="3"|R2Bees
|Artiste of the Year 
|
|-
|Hiplife/ Hip Hop Artiste of the Year 
|
|-
|Group of the Year
|
|-
| Slow down|Best Collaboration of the Year
|
|-
|Life''
|Vodafone song of the Year
|
|-
|"Odo"
|Highlife Song of the Year
|
|-
|rowspan="1"|Bayla Trap
|Hip Life/Hip Hop Song of the Year
|
|-
|rowspan="1"|Odo
|Male Vocal Performance
|
|-
|rowspan="1"|Mugeez
|Song Writer of the Year 
|
|-
|rowspan="3"|2011
|rowspan="2"|Kiss your hand 
|Afro pop song of the year
|
|-
|Collaboration of the year
|
|-
|rowspan="1"|R2Bees 
|Hip pop/Hiplife artist of the Year
|

The Headies

|-
| style="text-align:center;"|2013
|rowspan="2"|R2Bees
|rowspan="2"|Best African Artiste
|
|-
| style="text-align:center;"|2014
|

Nigeria Entertainment Awards

|-
| style="text-align:center;"|2013
|rowspan="2"|R2Bees
|Western African Artist or Group of the Year
|
|-
| style="text-align:center;"|2014
|African Artist of the Year (Non-Nigerian)
|

Selected videography

References

Dagbani-language singers
Ghanaian musicians
People from Tema
Ghanaian musical groups
Ghanaian rappers
Ghanaian highlife musicians
Ghanaian hip hop musicians